This is a discography of Gamma Ray, a German heavy metal band, formed in 1988 in Hamburg, Germany. They have released eleven studio albums, four live albums, two compilation albums, seven singles and eight music videos.

Albums

Studio albums

EPs
Heaven Can Wait (1990)
Skeletons & Majesties (2011)
Master of Confusion (2013)

Live albums
Alive '95 (1996)
Skeletons in the Closet (2003)
Hell Yeah! The Awesome Foursome (2008)
Skeletons & Majesties Live (2012)
Heading For The East (2015, recorded 1990)
Lust For Live (2016, recorded 1994)
30 Years Of Amazing Awesomeness (2021)

Compilation albums
The Karaoke Album (1997)
Blast from the Past (2000)
Alright! 20 Years Of Universe (2010)
The Best (Of) (2015)

Singles
"Heaven Can Wait/Mr. Outlaw" (1989)
"Who Do You Think You Are?" (1990)
"Future Madhouse" (1993)
"Rebellion In Dreamland" (1995)
"Silent Miracles" (1996)
"Valley of the Kings" (1997)
"Heaven Or Hell" (2001)
"Wannabees / One Life*" (2010)
"Avalon" (2014)
"Pale Rider" (2014)
"I Wil Return" (2014)
"Time For Deliverance" (2014)

Videos and DVDs
Heading for the East (1990 VHS, 1991 Laserdisc, 2003 DVD)
Lust for Live (1994 VHS, 1994 Laserdisc, 2003 DVD)
Hell Yeah - The Awesome Foursome (And The Finnish Keyboarder Who Didn't Want To Wear His Donald Duck Costume) Live in Montreal (2008)
Skeletons & Majesties Live (2012)
30 Years Of Amazing Awesomeness (2021)

Music videos

 "Space Eater" (1990)
 "One With the World" (1991)
 "Gamma Ray" (1993)
 "Rebellion in Dreamland" (1995)
 "Send Me a Sign" (1999)
 "Heart of the Unicorn" (2001)
 "Eagle" (2001)
 "Into the Storm" (2007)
 "To the Metal" (2010)
 "Rise" (2010)
 "Empathy" (2010)
 "Master of Confusion" (2013)
 "Hellbent" (2014)

References

Heavy metal group discographies
 
Discographies of German artists